West Carrizo Creek forms in Las Animas County, Colorado west-southwest of Kim, Colorado and flows generally east.   It connects with East Carrizo Creek, which forms in Colorado north of Mt. Carrizo and east of Kim, and which flows generally southeast before turning south, to form North Carrizo Creek at a point about six miles north of the Preston Monument, the tripoint of Colorado, Oklahoma and New Mexico.

See also
East Carrizo Creek
South Carrizo Creek
Carrizo Creek (New Mexico/Texas)
Carrizo Creek (Arizona)

References

Rivers of Colorado
Rivers of Las Animas County, Colorado
Rivers of Baca County, Colorado